Nabazenil (SP-175) is a synthetic cannabinoid receptor agonist, which has anticonvulsant properties.

References 

Cannabinoids
Benzochromenes
Azepanes
Carboxylate esters
anticonvulsants